Never Say Goodbye is a live album from Belgian musician Sam Bettens (as Sarah Bettens). It was released in 2008 by Universal Music Group/Cocoon Records.

Track listing
 "I Can Do Better Than You" - 2:21
 "Slow You Down" - 3:14)
 "Cry Me a River" - 3:49 (Live Acoustic Theatre Version)
 "Win Me Over" - 3:12
 "Come over Here" - 4:07 (Live Acoustic Theatre Version)
 "I Can't Make You Love Me" - 4:21 (Live)
 "Go" - 3:56 (Live Acoustic Theatre Version)
 "Scream" - 3:53 (Live Acoustic Theatre Version)
 "Daddy's Gun" - 4:06 (Live Acoustic Theatre Version)
 "Follow Me" - 4:18 (Live Acoustic Theatre Version)
 "Not an Addict" - 5:20 (Live Acoustic Theatre Version)

Charts

Sam Bettens albums
2008 live albums